Andrea Hlaváčková and Galina Voskoboeva were the defending champions but decided not to participate.
Bethanie Mattek-Sands and Sania Mirza won the title defeating Alicja Rosolska and Zheng Jie 6–3, 6–2 in the final.

Seeds

Draw

Draw

References
 Main Draw

Brussels Open - Doubles
2012 Doubles